The Osceola County Sheriff's Office is the largest and chief law enforcement agency in Osceola County, Florida, located in Kissimmee. Per the State of Florida Constitution, the Sheriff is the chief law enforcement officer of both the incorporated and unincorporated areas of the county. The current Sheriff is Marcos R. Lopez, the 20th sheriff of the county and the first Hispanic to serve as a Sheriff in the county. The agency has over 700 employees and serves a population of 390,341.  Osceola County deputies patrol  which include Kissimmee, St. Cloud, Celebration, and Poinciana as well as several other unincorporated communities.

History
The Osceola County Sheriff's Office has been a CFA-accredited law enforcement agency since 1999.

In 2021, a video went viral of a deputy slamming a student to the ground.

In February 2022, the office charged one of its own deputies with culpable negligence after he tased a suspect at a gas station and lit spilled gasoline, the subject, and himself on fire. In April, two deputies killed a man and injured two others in a Target parking lot: they were suspected of shoplifting Pokemon cards and pizza. Sheriff Lopez asked the Florida Department of Law Enforcement to investigate the incident, but later said he did not intend to make changes to the department's tactics.

Divisions
Enforcement Bureau
Uniform Patrol
Aviation Unit
Mounted Patrol Unit
HIDTA Task Force
IRS Task Force
FBI-JTTF

Criminal Investigations Division
East Property Crimes
West Property Crimes
Economic Crimes
Persons Crimes
Sex Crimes/Child Abuse
Crime Analysis/Intelligence
Robbery
Violent Crimes
Evidence Unit
Forensics

Specialty Units
SWAT
Emergency Response Team
Agriculture/Marine
Community Response Team
K-9 Unit
Tourism Policing Unit
Traffic/DUI Unit
Gang Unit
N.E.T.
O.C.I.B.

Administrative Bureau
Civilian Volunteers
Civil Process
Communications
Community Services
Court Services
Crime Prevention
Fleet Maintenance
Records
Information Management
Quality Assurance and Accreditation
Research and Development
School Resource
Training
Warrants
K9-Unit

References

External links
 Osceola County Sheriff's Office (Official site) 

Osceola County, Florida
Sheriffs' departments of Florida